Boom Bust Boom is a documentary about mankind's history of speculative bubbles. It was written, directed, and presented by former Monty Python member Terry Jones in his final film appearance before his death in 2020. It was released in 2016.

External links

Documentary films about economics
Films directed by Terry Jones